Chichester East is an electoral ward of Chichester District, West Sussex, England and returns two members to sit on Chichester District Council.

Ward Profile 
Chichester East ward is one of four wards within the city of Chichester, along with Chichester North, Chichester South and Chichester West. Since the formation of Chichester District Council in 1973, the ward has been a Liberal Democrat stronghold. In May 2015, the Conservative party candidates won all three seats for the first time.

Population 
In 2011, the population of Chichester East was 8,480, representing 7.5% of the total population of the Chichester District. It is the largest ward by population in the Chichester District.

The ward has a far higher proportion of ethnic minorities than average in the District. Approximately 7.8% of the population in the ward is an ethnic minority, compared to 3.1% in the District.

Chichester East has a lower proportion of owner-occupied housing than the District, with 41.5% owning their own home in the ward compared to 67.2% in the District.

Boundaries

Boundary review 
In March 2016, following a review of the ward structures, Chichester District Council proposed increasing the number of wards in the city from four to five. The proposal would reduce the number of members from three to two, with a reduction in the size of the electorate of approximately 1,500. The new proposed ward would cover five areas:
 The area between St Pancras and The Hornet east of Needlemakers and the triangle bounded by New Park Road, Spitalfield Lane, and St Pancras.
 The Swanfield Estate.
 The area between Green Lane and the by-pass bounded by Oving Road and Westhampnett Road.
 South side of Oving Road.
 The Bostock Road area and the arc south of Kingsmead Avenue.

Councillors

Election results

* Elected

See also 
 Wards of Chichester District
 Chichester District

References

External links
 Chichester District Council
 Election Maps

Wards of Chichester District